Eastgate railway station, also known as Eastgate-in-Weardale, served the village of Eastgate in County Durham, North East England from 1895 to 1953 as a stop on the Wear Valley Line.

History 

The station had a goods shed (which still remains as the only remaining example of one of many similar goods sheds on the Wearhead extension of the line) and a number of sidings however the lack of run-round facilities meant that all shunting had to be carried by a rope attached to the locomotive.

The station was closed to passengers by British Railways on 29 June 1953 when passenger services on the branch west of Wear Valley Junction were withdrawn, though goods traffic continued to serve the station for some years. This had opened in 1964 and utilised purpose built railway container waggons to transport most of the cement that it produced to Teesside, Tyneside and Scotland. On 14 September 1970, Eastgate became a public delivery siding and continued in this role until the withdrawal of the remaining local goods services on 14 September 1980. Cement traffic continued, however, and so the line was retained. Then, in 1988, BR introduced a summer Sunday extension to the regular  to  'Heritage Line' service as far as Stanhope and this was continued until the service was withdrawn after the summer of 1992 followed by the remaining cement traffic on 17 March 1993.

Rather than close the line when freight traffic was withdrawn, BR mothballed it and a campaign began in 1993 to preserve the line as a heritage railway. However the organisation struggled financially and the service was suspended a short time later, not recommencing until August 2006.

On 29 September 2009, the development of the Eastgate Renewable Energy Village received unanimous outline approval by the County Durham strategic planning committee. This plan would have involved the opening of a new station at Eastgate to serve new development on the site of the cement works (demolished in 2005) but the withdrawal of government funding in 2010 put the plans under threat and by 2013 the project appeared to have stalled.

The Weardale Railway did, however remain active and, after major efforts to clear the line of vegetation and repair damaged tracks, passenger services along the section between Stanhope and Bishop Auckland West were reintroduced on 23 May 2010 and continued until the end of the 2012 season. It is therefore possible that passenger services could return to Eastgate in future.

References

External links 

Disused railway stations in County Durham
Former North Eastern Railway (UK) stations
Railway stations in Great Britain opened in 1895
Railway stations in Great Britain closed in 1953
1895 establishments in England
1953 disestablishments in England
Stanhope, County Durham